Thoriq Munir Alkatiri (born 19 November 1988) is an Indonesian professional football referee. He has been a full international for FIFA since 2014.

Career
Thoriq has refereed in the Indonesia Super League (now Liga 1) since 2013, being promoted to the FIFA international referee list in 2014. He officiated numerous matches in the AFC Champions League and the AFC Cup, as a fourth official.

In April 2019, he officiated his first 2019 AFC Cup match, the group stage tie between Al-Qadsia and Malkiya.

He was appointed to referee three matches at 2019 Pacific Games in Samoa, the group stage clashes between Papua New Guinea and Vanuatu, Tahiti and New Caledonia, and bronze medal match between Papua New Guinea and Fiji which Fiji won after penalties.

References 

1988 births
Living people
Indonesian football referees
People from Purwakarta Regency
Indonesian people of Yemeni descent